The ELCIDIS (Electric vehicle City Distribution) project ran between about 1989 and 2002 was initiated by CITELEC (the European Association of cities interested in electric vehicles), and was approved for funding under the Energy Programme of the European Commission.

the project involved 6 European cities: 
Rotterdam in the Netherlands,
Stockholm, Sweden,
La Rochelle, France,
Erlangen, Germany,
Regione Lombardia/Milan, Italy and
Stavanger, Norway.

There was also observers from Belgium, England, Ireland, Switzerland and Monaco.

ELCIDIS experimented with a varied selection of battery electric vehicles  and hybrid electric vehicles, mostly  light trucks and  vans  for local deliveries combined with an urban distribution center (UDC) to interconnect with conventional distribution networks for perishable consumer goods.

See also
World Electric Vehicle Association

External links
ELCIDIS
CITILEC

Electric vehicle organizations